Whose Fist Is This Anyway? is an EP by American metal band Prong. It consists of five remixes done by various artists, including Paul Raven who later replaced Troy Gregory on bass guitar, and JG Thirlwell of Foetus. The EP features a previously unreleased cover song titled "Talk Talk" (originally by The Music Machine).

Track listing
"Prove You Wrong (Fuzzbuster Mix)" – 4:50
"Get a Grip (On Yourself) (Harm Mix)" – 3:25
"Hell If I Could (Dub Mix)" – 4:56
"Irrelevant Thoughts (Safety Mix)" – 2:52
"Talk Talk" – 1:59 (The Music Machine cover)
"Prove You Wrong (Xanax Mix)" – 8:46

Personnel
Tommy Victor – vocals/guitar
Troy Gregory – bass
Ted Parsons – drums
John Bechdel – keyboards

Prong (band) albums
1992 EPs
1992 remix albums
Remix EPs
Epic Records remix albums
Epic Records EPs